A Voyage to Terra Australis: Undertaken for the Purpose of Completing the Discovery of that Vast Country, and Prosecuted in the Years 1801, 1802, and 1803, in His Majesty's Ship the Investigator was a sea voyage journal written by English mariner and explorer Matthew Flinders. It describes his circumnavigation of the Australian continent in the early years of the 19th century, and his imprisonment by the French on the island of Mauritius from 1804–1810.

Circumnavigation

The book told in great detail of his explorations and included maps and drawings of the profiles of unknown coastline areas of what Flinders called "Terra Australis Incognita". By this, he was referring to the great unknown Southern continent that had been sighted and partly mapped by prominent earlier mariners such as Captain James Cook. The ship Flinders commanded, was a 334-ton sloop. Up until this time the circumnavigation of Australia which was necessary to prove it was a single continent land mass, had never been completed. He achieved this by circling the island continent, leaving Sydney in July 1802, heading north, through Torres Strait, across the top of the continent westward, and south along the western coastline. Flinders reached and named Cape Leeuwin on 6 December 1802, and proceeded to make a survey along the southern coast of the Australian mainland, and then completing the journey, arrived back in Sydney in June 1803, despite the dangerous condition of his ship.

Returning Home To England
Flinders' further description of imprisonment on Mauritius preceded his final return to England in October 1810 in poor health: despite this he immediately resumed work preparing A Voyage to Terra Australis and his maps for publication. In January 1811 approval for publication of his narrative was given by the Admiralty, but payment was restricted to the atlas and charts sections.  Flinders was responsible for funding the major work. The full title of this book which was first published in London in July 1814 was given, as was common at the time, a synoptic description: "A Voyage to Terra Australis: undertaken for the purpose of completing the discovery of that vast country, and prosecuted in the years 1801, 1802, and 1803 in His Majesty's ship the Investigator, and subsequently in the armed vessel Porpoise and Cumberland Schooner. With an account of the shipwreck of the Porpoise, arrival of the Cumberland at Mauritius, and imprisonment of the commander during six years and a half in that island".

Publications

Original publications of the Atlas to Flinders' Voyage to Terra Australis are held at the Mitchell Library in Sydney, Australia, as a portfolio that accompanied the book and included engravings of 16 maps, 4 plates of views, and 10 plates of Australian flora.

The book was republished in 3 volumes in 1966 accompanied by a reproduction of the portfolio.
Flinders' map of Terra Australis was first published in January 1814 and the remaining maps were published before his atlas and book. On 19 July 1814, the day after the book and atlas was published, Matthew Flinders died, at the age of 40.

See also
European and American voyages of scientific exploration: 1801–1803: HMS Investigator
General remarks, geographical and systematical, on the botany of Terra Australis
History of Australia

References

Further reading

 (Coin issue by the Royal Australian Mint honouring the 200th anniversary of the publication of Flinders' Journal)

External links

A Voyage to Terra Australis online
Archive.org: Volume 1, Volume 2
Project Gutenberg: Volume 1, Volume 2
Bibliothèque nationale de France: Volume 1, Volume 2, Atlas(?)
Logbooks of HMS Investigator 1801–3 kept by Matthew Flinders (online)
Volume 1, Volume 2 State Library of New South Wales
Volume 3 British Atmospheric Data Centre
A Voyage to Terra Australis, Volume 1 – National Museum of Australia
A Voyage to Terra Australis, Volume 2 – National Museum of Australia

1814 non-fiction books
Books about Australian exploration
Exploration of Australia
19th-century Australian literature